Thomas Grasso may refer to:
 Thomas J. Grasso (1962–1995), American convicted murderer
 Thomas Grasso (gymnast) (born 2000), Italian artistic gymnast